Kanellopoulos is a Greek surname, meaning "son of Kanellos". The feminine form is Kanellopoulou (Κανελλοπούλου). Notable people with the surname include:

Angeliki Kanellopoulou (born 1965), Greek tennis player
Kanellos Kanellopoulos (born 1957), Greek cyclist
Maria Kanellopoulou (born 1977), Greek water polo player
Panagiotis Kanellopoulos (1902–1986), Greek writer, politician and Prime Minister of Greece
Takis Kanellopoulos (1933–1990), Greek film director and screenwriter

Greek-language surnames
Surnames
Patronymic surnames